Washington Irving High School may refer to:

 Washington Irving High School (New York City)
 Washington Irving High School (Tarrytown, New York)
 Washington Irving High School (West Virginia)

See also
 Washington Irving Middle School (disambiguation)

Washington Irving